Longone may refer to:

 Jan Longone, American food writer and food historian

Places 

 Longone al Segrino, small village and comune between Como and Lecco in the province of Como in Lombardy, Italy
 Longone Sabino, comune in the Province of Rieti in Latium, Italy
 Porto Longone, old name of Porto Azzurro